Casiguran may refer to the following municipalities in the Philippines:

 Casiguran, Aurora 
 Casiguran, Sorsogon